Dzmitry Shako (born March 25, 1979) is a male hammer thrower from Belarus. He set his personal best (78.54 metres) in the men's hammer throw event on July 27, 2008 in Minsk, Belarus.

Achievements

References

1979 births
Living people
Belarusian male hammer throwers
Place of birth missing (living people)